The Hearse is a 1980 American supernatural horror film directed by George Bowers and starring Trish Van Devere and Joseph Cotten. It follows a schoolteacher from San Francisco who relocates to a small town in northern California to spend the summer in a house she inherited from her deceased aunt, only to uncover her aunt's past as a devil worshipper, which seems to trigger a series of supernatural occurrences.

Plot
Jane Hardy, a schoolteacher in San Francisco, suffers a nervous breakdown following a divorce and the simultaneous death of her mother. To emotionally recover, she decides to spend the summer in the rural town of Blackford in a home left to her by her late aunt, Rebecca. Upon arriving, she is given keys to the house by Walter Pritchard, a local attorney who claims Jane's mother once promised to bestow him the property. Shortly after moving in, Jane begins experiencing supernatural occurrences, including witnessing apparitions of her aunt Rebecca, and a ghostly black hearse driven by a mysterious man that pulls into the driveway before vanishing. Furthermore, she is unsettled by the locals' passive-aggressive reactions to her presence in the town, including from Pritchard, who is deliberately unhurried to place the home in her name.

Jane hires Paul, the son of the local hardware store owner, to help her make repairs on the home. Jane finds a trunk in the attic full of her aunt's personal mementos, including a diary in which she wrote of her life as a minister's wife. Late one night, Jane crashes her car on the way home, and is given a ride by Tom Sullivan, a mysterious but kind man passing by in a vintage black car. Tom pays for a tow truck for Jane, and returns the following night with her car. Jane accepts his invitation to go boating on a nearby lake.

Later that night, Jane uncovers more details from her aunt Rebecca's diary that reveal Rebecca was indoctrinated by her boyfriend Robert, who was a devil worshipper, and convinced her to join him in a pact with Satan. Shortly after, Jane has a vivid nightmare in which she is taken away by the hearse as her aunt watches from the house, and Jane observes her own funeral. Jane's mental stability is further challenged by other odd goings-on in the home, including the sounds of what she believes are people breaking in at night. She later sees a woman from one of her nightmares at the local church, but her fears are assuaged by the Reverend Winston.

Once the house is finally probated to Jane, Pritchard confirms to Jane that her aunt Rebecca worshipped Satan, and that upon her death, the hearse carrying her body crashed on the nearby road; the driver of the hearse, along with Rebecca's body and her coffin, inexplicably disappeared. Since this event, locals have been haunted by the image of the hearse. Meanwhile, Jane continues her romance with Tom, and after a date, invites him into her home, where they have sex. Jane's romance with Tom upsets Paul, who expresses that he too is attracted to her.

One night, after Tom fails to arrive for a date, a drunken Pritchard begins vandalizing the home, causing Jane to flee in terror. Paul arrives shortly after to leave flowers for Jane, only to be attacked by an unseen assailant. Meanwhile, Jane arrives at Tom's house, but finds it inexplicably abandoned and dilapidated; she finds a framed antique photo of a young Rebecca with Tom. Behind the home, Jane finds a gravestone inscribed "Robert Thomas Sullivan". Terrified, Jane returns to her home to pack her belongings, intending to leave. In the bathroom, she finds Pritchard's corpse hanging in the shower, along with Paul's body. Jane is confronted by Tom, who professes his love for her and explains that Rebecca was "too weak" and did not fulfill her pact with Satan. Promising Jane eternal life, Tom begins to cast a spell on her, but is interrupted by Reverend Winston, who begins an exorcism to save Jane. She flees in her car, followed by Tom driving the hearse. The chase ends in a collision that causes the hearse to topple off a cliff and explode.

Back at the home, an apparition of Rebecca appears in the window as the house goes dark.

Cast

Production
Principal photography took place in San Francisco and Bradbury, California, beginning October 29, 1979. Filming was completed by January 1980.

Two 1952 Packard Funeral Coaches, converted by Henney Motor Company, were used in the film. One of them is prominently featured on the film's poster.

Release
The Hearse premiered in New York City on June 6, 1980, and had its Los Angeles premiere on September 12 of that year.

Critical response
Roger Ebert of the Chicago Sun-Times wrote, "The Hearse qualifies as this summer's garage sale of horror movies. It contains all the best clichés from recent, more successful horror movies (especially [The] Amityville [Horror] and even The Changeling, which came out last April and starred Van Devere, her husband George C. Scott and, of course, the obligatory self-banging doors and self-playing musical instruments)."

Janet Maslin of The New York Times said, "The Hearse was directed by George Bowers, and shot either in a very stylized fashion or without benefit of a light meter – many of the film's outdoor scenes feature brilliant blue skies and actors with dim, shadowy faces. As far as the horror goes, Mr. Bowers makes his film moderately scary and pretty unpleasant, too. No one gets a hatchet in the forehead, though, the way one of the actors does in Friday the 13th. Isn't that nice to know?"

Home media
Rhino Entertainment released The Hearse on DVD on February 12, 2002. In May 2017, Vinegar Syndrome released the film in a Blu-ray/DVD combination pack, featuring a newly restored 2K scan of the original film elements.

References

External links

1980 films
1980 horror films
1980 independent films
1980s psychological thriller films
American supernatural horror films
American haunted house films
American supernatural thriller films
American independent films
Films about automobiles
Films about inheritances
Films about Satanism
Films about witchcraft
Crown International Pictures films
1980s English-language films
Films directed by George Bowers
1980 directorial debut films
1980s American films